The Desmond Rebellions occurred in 1569–1573 and 1579–1583 in the Irish province of Munster.

They were rebellions by the Earl of Desmond, the head of the FitzGerald dynasty  in Munster, and his followers, the Geraldines and their allies, against the threat of the extension of the English government over the province. The rebellions were motivated primarily by the desire to maintain the independence of feudal lords from their monarch but also had an element of religious antagonism between Catholic Geraldines and the Protestant English state. They culminated in the destruction of the Desmond dynasty and the plantation or colonisation of Munster with English Protestant settlers. 'Desmond' is the Anglicisation of the Irish Deasmumhain, meaning 'South Munster'
In addition to the Scorched Earth policy, it might be worth mentioning that, Sir Humphrey Gilbert, Warham St Leger, Perrot and later Nicholas Malby and Lord Grey and William Pelham, deliberately targeted civilians. Woman and children, the elderly or infirm or even those of diminished mental capacity. This was done regardless of whether they were pro the Desmonds or not. It was considered a good policy to terrorise the native population. The American author Richard Berleth covers it in great detail in his book the twilight Lords.

Causes
The south of Ireland (the provinces of Munster and southern Leinster) was dominated, as it had been for over two centuries, by the Old English Butlers of Ormonde and the Fitzmaurices and FitzGeralds of Desmond. Both families raised their own armed forces and imposed their own law, a mixture of Irish and English customs independent of the English government imposed on Ireland. Beginning in the 1530s, successive English administrations tried to expand English control over Ireland (See Tudor conquest of Ireland). By the 1560s, their attention had turned to the south of Ireland and Henry Sidney, as Lord Deputy of Ireland, was charged with establishing the authority of the English government over the independent lordships there. His solution was the formation of "lord presidencies", provincial military governors who would replace the local lords as military powers and keepers of the peace.

The dynasties saw the presidencies as intrusions into their sphere of influence. Their interfamilial competition had seen the Butlers and FitzGeralds fight a pitched battle against each other at Affane in County Waterford in 1565 in defiance of English law. Elizabeth I summoned the heads of both houses to London to explain their actions. However, the treatment of the dynasties was not even-handed. Thomas Butler, 10th Earl of Ormonde — "Black Tom" Butler, Queen Elizabeth's cousin and friend – was pardoned, while both Gerald FitzGerald, 14th Earl of Desmond (in 1567) and his brother, John of Desmond, widely regarded as the real military leader of the FitzGeralds, (in 1568) were arrested and detained in the Tower of London on Ormonde's urging.

This decapitated the natural leadership of the Munster Geraldines and left the Desmond earldom in the hands of a soldier, James FitzMaurice, the captain general of the Desmond military. FitzMaurice had little stake in a new demilitarised order in Munster, with abolition of the Irish lords' armies. A factor that drew wider support for FitzMaurice was the prospect of land confiscations, which had been mooted by Sidney and Peter Carew, an English claimant to lands granted to an ancestor just after the Norman conquest of Ireland that had been lost soon afterwards.

This ensured FitzMaurice the support of important Munster clans, notably MacCarthy Mór, O'Sullivan Beare and O'Keefe, and two prominent Butlers, brothers of the Earl. Fitzmaurice himself had lost the land he had held at Kerricurrihy in County Cork, which had been taken and leased to English colonists. He was a devout Catholic, influenced by the counter-reformation, and saw the Protestant Elizabethan governors as his enemies.

To discourage Sidney from going ahead with the Lord Presidency for Munster and to re-establish Desmond primacy over the Butlers, FitzMaurice planned rebellion against the English presence in the south, and against the Earl of Ormonde. FitzMaurice had wider aims than simply the recovery of FitzGerald supremacy within the context of the English Kingdom of Ireland. Before the rebellion, he had secretly sent Maurice MacGibbon, Catholic Archbishop of Cashel, to seek military aid from Philip II of Spain.

First Desmond Rebellion

FitzMaurice first attacked the English colony at Kerrycurihy south of Cork city in June 1569, before attacking Cork itself and those native lords who refused to join the rebellion. FitzMaurice's force of 4,500 men went on to besiege Kilkenny, seat of the Earls of Ormonde, in July. In response, Sidney mobilised 600 English troops, who marched south from Dublin and another 400 landed by sea in Cork. Thomas Butler, Earl of Ormonde, returned from London, where he had been at court, and mobilised the Butlers and some Gaelic Irish clans antagonistic to the Geraldines. After the failed attempt to take Kilkenny, the rebellion quickly descended into an untidy mopping-up operation.

Together, Ormonde, Sidney, and Humphrey Gilbert, appointed as governor of Munster, devastated the lands of FitzMaurice's allies in a scorched earth policy. FitzMaurice's forces broke up, as individual lords had to retire to defend their own territories. Gilbert, a half-brother of Sir Walter Raleigh, was the most notorious for terror tactics, killing civilians at random and setting up corridors of severed heads at the entrance to his camps.

Sidney forced FitzMaurice into the mountains of Kerry, from where he launched guerrilla attacks on the English and their allies. By 1570, most of FitzMaurice's allies had submitted to Sidney. The most important, Donal MacCarthy Mór, surrendered in November 1569. Nevertheless, the guerrilla campaign continued for three more years. In February 1571, John Perrot was made Lord President of Munster. He pursued FitzMaurice with 700 troops for over a year without success. FitzMaurice had some victories, capturing an English ship near Kinsale and burning the town of Kilmallock in 1571, but by early 1573 his force was reduced to less than 100 men. FitzMaurice finally submitted on 23 February 1573, having negotiated a pardon for his life. However, in 1574, he became landless, and in 1575 he sailed to France to seek help from the Catholic powers to start another rebellion.

Gerald FitzGerald, Earl of Desmond, and his brother, John, were released from prison to reconstruct their shattered territory. Under a settlement imposed after the rebellion, known as "composition", the Desmonds' military forces were limited by law to just 20 horsemen; their tenants were made to pay rent to them rather than supply military service or quarter their soldiers. Perhaps the biggest winner of the first Desmond Rebellion was the Earl of Ormonde, who established himself as the most powerful lord in the south of Ireland due to siding with the English crown.

All of the local chiefs had submitted by the end of the rebellion. The methods used to suppress it provoked lingering resentment, especially among the Irish mercenaries; gall óglaigh or gallowglass as the English termed them, who had rallied to FitzMaurice. William Drury, Lord President of Munster from 1576, executed around 700 of these men in the years after the rebellion.

In the aftermath of the uprising, Gaelic customs such as Brehon Laws, Irish dress, bardic poetry, and the maintaining of "private armies" – things that were deeply valued in traditional Irish society - were again outlawed and suppressed. FitzMaurice had emphasised the Gaelic character of the rebellion, wearing Irish dress, speaking only Irish, and referring to himself as the taoiseach of the Geraldines. Irish landowners continued to be threatened by the arrival of English colonists to settle on land confiscated from the Irish. All of these factors meant that, when FitzMaurice returned from Europe to start a new rebellion, plenty of people in Munster were willing to join him.

In late 1569 the Catholic Northern Rebellion broke out in England, but was crushed. This and the Desmond Rebellion caused Pope Pius V to issue Regnans in Excelsis, a bull excommunicating Elizabeth and depriving her of the allegiance of her Catholic subjects. Elizabeth had previously accepted Catholic worship in private, but now suppressed militant Catholicism. Luckily for her, most of her Irish subjects did not want to get involved in rebellions, while also mostly remaining Catholic.

Second Desmond Rebellion

The second Desmond rebellion was sparked when James FitzMaurice launched an invasion of Munster in 1579. During his exile in Europe he had declared himself as a soldier of the counter-reformation, arguing that since the Pope's excommunication of Elizabeth I Irish Catholics did not owe loyalty to a heretic monarch. The Pope granted FitzMaurice an indulgence and supplied him with troops and money. FitzMaurice landed at Smerwick, near Dingle (modern County Kerry) on 18 July 1579 with a small force of Spanish and Italian troops. He was joined on 1 August by John of Desmond, a brother of the earl, who had a large following among his kinsmen and the disaffected swordsmen of Munster. Other Gaelic clans and Old English families also joined in the rebellion.

FitzMaurice was killed in a skirmish with the Clanwilliam Burkes on 18 August, and John FitzGerald assumed leadership of the rebellion.

Gerald, the Earl of Desmond, initially resisted the call of the rebels and tried to remain neutral but gave in once the authorities had proclaimed him a traitor. He joined the rebellion by sacking Youghal (on 13 November) and Kinsale, and devastated the country of the English and their allies.

In the summer of 1580 English troops under William Pelham and locally raised Irish forces under the Earl of Ormonde retook the south coast, destroyed the lands of the Desmonds and their allies, and killed their tenants. They captured Carrigafoyle, the principal Desmond castle at the mouth of the Shannon  at Easter 1580, cutting off the Geraldine forces from the rest of the country and prevented a landing of foreign troops into the main Munster ports.

In July 1580 the rising spread to Leinster, under the leadership of Fiach MacHugh O'Byrne and his client the Pale lord James Eustace, 3rd Viscount Baltinglass. They ambushed and massacred a large English force under the Lord Deputy of Ireland Lord Grey de Wilton at the battle of Glenmalure on 25 August.

On 10 September 1580, 600 papal troops landed at Smerwick in Kerry to support the rebellion. They were besieged in a fort at Dún an Óir. They surrendered after two days of bombardment and were then massacred. Through the relentless scorched-earth tactics of the English, who killed animals and razed crops and homes to deprive the Irish of any food or shelter, the rebellion was crushed by mid-1581. By May 1581, most of the minor rebels and FitzGerald allies in Munster and Leinster had accepted Elizabeth I's offer of a general pardon.  John of Desmond was killed north of Cork in early 1582.

The Geraldine earl was pursued by English forces until the end. From 1581 to 1583, his supporters evaded capture in the mountains of Kerry. On 2 November 1583 the earl was hunted down and killed near Tralee in Kerry by the O'Moriarty family and English soldiers from Castle Maine. The clan chief, Maurice, received 1,000 pounds of silver and a pension of 20 pounds a year from the English government for Desmond's head, which was sent to Queen Elizabeth. Desmond's body was displayed on the walls of Cork. (Maurice O'Moriarty ended his life by being hanged at Tyburn.)

Aftermath

After three years of scorched earth warfare by the English, Munster was racked by famine. In April 1582, the provost marshal of Munster, Sir Warham St Leger, estimated that 30,000 people had died of hunger in the previous six months. Plague broke out in Cork city, to where the country people had fled to avoid the fighting. People continued to die of starvation and plague long after the war had ended, and it is estimated that by 1589 one-third of the province's population had died. Grey was recalled by Elizabeth I for his excessive brutality. Two famous accounts tell us of the devastation of Munster after the Desmond rebellion. The first is from the Gaelic Annals of the Four Masters:

The second is from the View of the Present State of Ireland, written by English poet Edmund Spenser, who fought in the campaign, approved the scorched earth method, and suggested it as a useful method of enforcing English ways:

The wars of the 1570s and 1580s marked a watershed in Ireland. The southern Geraldine axis of power was annihilated, and Munster was "planted" with English colonists given land confiscated from those who fought for their country.  After a survey begun in 1584 by Sir Valentine Browne, Surveyor General of Ireland, the thousands of English soldiers and administrators who had been imported to suppress the rebellion were given land in the Munster Plantation of Desmond's confiscated estates. The Elizabethan conquest of Ireland followed the subsequent Nine Years War in Ulster and the extension of plantation policy to other parts of the country.

See also
List of Irish rebellions
Tudor conquest of Ireland
Early Modern Ireland 1536-1691

Notes

References
Colm Lennon,	Sixteenth Century Ireland – The Incomplete Conquest, Dublin 1994.
Edward O'Mahony, Baltimore, the O'Driscolls, and the end of Gaelic civilisation, 1538–1615, Mizen Journal, no. 8 (2000): 110–127.
Nicholas Canny, The Elizabethan Conquest of Ireland,	Harvester Press Ltd,	Sussex 1976.	
Nicholas Canny, Making Ireland British 1580–1650,	Oxford University Press, Oxford 2001.

16th century in Ireland
16th-century military history of the Kingdom of England
16th-century rebellions
Rebellions in Ireland
Tudor rebellions
Wars involving Ireland
FitzGerald dynasty
Catholic rebellions